Maiztegui is a surname. Notable people with the surname include:

Isidro B. Maiztegui (1905–1996), Argentine composer
Jon Santacana Maiztegui (born 1980), Spanish alpine skier
Julio Isidro Maiztegui (1931–1993), Argentine physician and epidemiologist
Laura Maiztegui (born 1978), Argentine field hockey player

See also
6307 Maiztegui, a main-belt asteroid